In political science, legitimacy is the right and acceptance of an authority, usually a governing law or a regime. Whereas authority denotes a specific position in an established government, the term legitimacy denotes a system of government—wherein government denotes "sphere of influence". An authority viewed as legitimate often has the right and justification to exercise power. Political legitimacy is considered a basic condition for governing, without which a government will suffer legislative deadlock(s) and collapse. In political systems where this is not the case, unpopular regimes survive because they are considered legitimate by a small, influential elite. In Chinese political philosophy, since the historical period of the Zhou Dynasty (1046–256 BC), the political legitimacy of a ruler and government was derived from the Mandate of Heaven, and unjust rulers who lost said mandate therefore lost the right to rule the people.

In moral philosophy, the term legitimacy is often positively interpreted as the normative status conferred by a governed people upon their governors' institutions, offices, and actions, based upon the belief that their government's actions are appropriate uses of power by a legally constituted government.

The Enlightenment-era British social philosopher John Locke (1632–1704) said that political legitimacy derives from popular explicit and implicit consent of the governed: "The argument of the [Second] Treatise is that the government is not legitimate unless it is carried on with the consent of the governed." The German political philosopher Dolf Sternberger said that "[l]egitimacy is the foundation of such governmental power as is exercised, both with a consciousness on the government's part that it has a right to govern, and with some recognition by the governed of that right". The American political sociologist Seymour Martin Lipset said that legitimacy also "involves the capacity of a political system to engender and maintain the belief that existing political institutions are the most appropriate and proper ones for the society". The American political scientist Robert A. Dahl explained legitimacy as a reservoir: so long as the water is at a given level, political stability is maintained, if it falls below the required level, political legitimacy is endangered.

Types 
Legitimacy is "a value whereby something or someone is recognized and accepted as right and proper". In political science, legitimacy has traditionally been understood as the popular acceptance and recognition by the public of the authority of a governing régime, whereby authority has political power through consent and mutual understandings, not coercion. The three types of political legitimacy described by German sociologist Max Weber, in ”Politics as Vocation,” are traditional, charismatic, and rational-legal:
 Traditional legitimacy derives from societal custom and habit that emphasize the history of the authority of tradition. Traditionalists understand this form of rule as historically accepted, hence its continuity, because it is the way society has always been. Therefore, the institutions of traditional government usually are historically continuous, as in monarchy and tribalism.
 Charismatic legitimacy derives from the ideas and personal charisma of the leader, a person whose authoritative persona charms and psychologically dominates the people of the society to agreement with the government's régime and rule. A charismatic government usually features weak political and administrative institutions, because they derive authority from the persona of the leader, and usually disappear without the leader in power. However, if the charismatic leader has a successor, a government derived from charismatic legitimacy might continue.
 Rational-legal legitimacy derives from a system of institutional procedure, wherein government institutions establish and enforce law and order in the public interest. Therefore, it is through public trust that the government will abide the law that confers rational-legal legitimacy.
More recent scholarship distinguishes between multiple other types of legitimacy in an effort to draw distinctions between various approaches to the construct. These include empirical legitimacy versus normative legitimacy, popular legitimacy, regulative legitimacy, and procedural legitimacy. Types of legitimacy draw distinctions that account for different sources of legitimacy, different frameworks for evaluating legitimacy, or different objects of legitimacy.

Forms

Numinous legitimacy 

In a theocracy, government legitimacy derives from the spiritual authority of a god or a goddess.
 In ancient Egypt (c. 3150 BC), the legitimacy of the dominion of a Pharaoh (god–king) was theologically established by a doctrine that posited the pharaoh as the Egyptian patron god Horus, son of Osiris.

Civil legitimacy 

The political legitimacy of a civil government derives from agreement among the autonomous constituent institutions—legislative, judicial, executive—combined for the national common good. In the United States, this issue has surfaced around how voting is impacted by gerrymandering, the United States Electoral College's ability to produce winners by minority rule and discouragement of voter turnout outside of Swing states, and the repeal of part of the Voting Rights Act in 2013. Another challenge to the political legitimacy offered by elections is whether or not marginalized groups such as women or those who are incarcerated are allowed to vote.

Civil legitimacy can be granted through different measures for accountability than voting, such as financial transparency and stake-holder accountability. In the international system another method for measuring civil legitimacy is through accountability to international human rights norms.

In an effort to determine what makes a government legitimate, the Center for Public Impact launched a project to hold a global conversation about legitimacy stating, inviting citizens, academics and governments to participate. The organization also publishes case studies that consider the theme of legitimacy as it applies to projects in a number of different countries including Bristol, Lebanon and Canada.

"Good" governance vs "bad" governance 
The United Nations Human Rights Office of the High Commission (OHCHR) established standards of what is considered "good governance" that include the key attributes transparency, responsibility, accountability, participation and responsiveness (to the needs of the people).

Input, output and throughput legitimacy 
Assessing the political legitimacy of a government can be done by looking at three different aspects of which a government can derive legitimacy. Fritz Scharpf introduced two normative criteria, which are output legitimacy, i.e. the effectiveness of policy outcomes for people and input legitimacy, the responsiveness to citizen concerns as a result of participation by the people. A third normative criterion was added by Vivien Schmidt, who analyzes legitimacy also in terms of what she calls throughput, i.e. the governance processes that happen in between input and output.

Negative and positive legitimacy 
Abulof distinguishes between negative political legitimacy (NPL), which is about the object of legitimation (answering what is legitimate), and positive political legitimacy (PPL), which is about the source of legitimation (answering who is the 'legitimator'). NPL is concerned with establishing where to draw the line between good and bad; PPL with who should be drawing it in the first place. From the NPL perspective, political legitimacy emanates from appropriate actions; from a PPL perspective, it emanates from appropriate actors. In the social contract tradition, Hobbes and Locke focused on NPL (stressing security and liberty, respectively), while Rousseau focused more on PPL ("the people" as the legitimator). Arguably, political stability depends on both forms of legitimacy.

Instrumental and substantive legitimacy 
Weber's understanding of legitimacy rests on shared values, such as tradition and rational-legality. But policies that aim at (re-)constructing legitimacy by improving the service delivery or 'output' of a state often only respond to shared needs. Therefore, substantive sources of legitimacy need to be distinguished from more instrumental ones. Instrumental legitimacy rests on "the rational assessment of the usefulness of an authority ..., describing to what extent an authority responds to shared needs. Instrumental legitimacy is very much based on the perceived effectiveness of service delivery. Conversely, substantive legitimacy is a more abstract normative judgment, which is underpinned by shared values. If a person believes that an entity has the right to exercise social control, he or she may also accept personal disadvantages."

Perceived legitimacy 
Establishing legitimacy is not simply transactional; service provision, elections and rule of law do not automatically grant legitimacy. State legitimacy rests on citizens’ perceptions and expectations of the state, and these are co-constructed between state actors and citizens. What legitimizes a state is also contextually specific. McCullough et al. (2020) show that in different countries, provision of different services build state legitimacy. In Nepal public water provision was most associated with state legitimacy, while in Pakistan it was health services. But it is not only states that that can build legitimacy. Other authorities, such as armed groups in a conflict zones, may construct legitimacy more successfully than the state in certain strata of the population.

Foundational and contingent legitimacy 
Political theorist Ross Mittiga has proposed an alternative typology, consisting of two parts: foundational and contingent legitimacy. According to Mittiga, foundational legitimacy (FL) "pertains to a government’s ability to ensure the safety and security of its citizens," while contingent legitimacy (CL) obtains in situations in which governments "exercise[] power in acceptable ways."

Mittiga specifies further that FL:...is bound up with a range of political capacities and actions including, among other things, being able to ensure continuous access to essential goods (particularly food, water, and shelter), prevent avoidable catastrophes, provide immediate and effective disaster relief, and combat invading forces or quell unjustified uprisings or rebellions. If a government cannot fulfill these basic security functions, it is not legitimate, if it is even a government at all. [p.3]On the other hand, Mittiga acknowledges that there is "extensive debate" about which factors are relevant to CL, but argues that, "[a]mong the most commonly defended factors" are "the presence of democratic rights and processes, consent, guarantees of equal representation, provision of core public benefits, protection of basic individual rights and freedoms, social justice, and observance of fairness principles." [pp. 4–5] Mittiga specifies further that "[m]ost contemporary theorists maintain that legitimacy [in the contingent sense] requires multiple of these factors—some of which are procedural and others substantive."

According to Mittiga, what makes certain aspects of legitimacy "contingent" (as opposed to "foundational") is that they are affected by (1) "the problem of pluralism"—i.e., the idea that "any firm agreement on" which factor(s) matters (or matter most of all) "will remain elusive or at least always open to contestation and renegotiation"; (2) "the problem of partial displacement," which holds that "when new legitimation factors emerge," as they often have historically, "earlier ones may not entirely disappear but only become less salient, at least for sizable portions of the citizenry"; and (3) "the problem of exceptional circumstances," which is "the fact that even widely shared and seemingly stable CL factors are routinely relaxed or abandoned during emergencies, often without calling into question the basic legitimacy of the government."

Mittiga summarizes the difference between these two types or levels or types of legitimacy as follows:The factors associated with CL condition the use of political power by specifying, for instance, what can or cannot be done or sacrificed, how decisions should be made, and who counts (and for how much). The answers to these questions often appear to us as moral universals; yet, in practice, they are the products of long and contentious historical processes. FL, on the other hand, does not vary between societies, generations, or circumstances. Ensuring safety and security is always the primary—though, in good states, under reasonably favorable conditions, not the exclusive—end of political power.

Aristotle expresses something like this in insisting that the point of political society is to furnish the resources needed not just to live but to live well. Crudely put, FL is about living, CL about living well. And it is of course impossible to live well without living: after all, there can be no democracy of desolation, no fair social cooperation in conditions of extreme scarcity, no real rights when political stability is maintainable only through raw assertions of coercive power (if it can be maintained at all). In this sense, FL is necessarily prior to CL, and must be regarded as such in moments when trade-offs become a necessary part of the political calculus. [p.7]

Sources 
 
Max Weber proposed that societies behave cyclically in governing themselves with different types of governmental legitimacy. That democracy was unnecessary for establishing legitimacy, a condition that can be established with codified laws, customs, and cultural principles, not by means of popular suffrage. That a society might decide to revert from the legitimate government of a rational–legal authority to the charismatic government of a leader; e.g., the Nazi Germany of Adolf Hitler, Fascist Italy under Benito Mussolini, and Francoist Spain under General Francisco Franco.

The French political scientist Mattei Dogan's contemporary interpretation of Weber's types of political legitimacy (traditional, charismatic, legal-rational) proposes that they are conceptually insufficient to comprehend the complex relationships that constitute a legitimate political system in the 21st century. Moreover, Dogan proposed that traditional authority and charismatic authority are obsolete as forms of contemporary government; e.g., the Islamic Republic of Iran (est. 1979) rule by means of the priestly Koranic interpretations by the Ayatollah Ruhollah Khomeini. That traditional authority has disappeared in the Middle East; that the rule-proving exceptions are Islamic Iran and Saudi Arabia. Furthermore, the third Weber type of political legitimacy, rational-legal authority, exists in so many permutations no longer allow it to be limited as a type of legitimate authority.

Forms of legitimate government 
In determining the political legitimacy of a system of rule and government, the term proper—political legitimacy—is philosophically an essentially contested concept that facilitates understanding the different applications and interpretations of abstract, qualitative, and evaluative concepts such as "art", "social justice", et cetera, as applied in aesthetics, political philosophy, the philosophy of history, and the philosophy of religion. Therefore, in defining the political legitimacy of a system of government and rule, the term "essentially contested concept" indicates that a key term (communism, democracy, constitutionalism, etc.) has different meanings within a given political argument. Hence, the intellectually restrictive politics of dogmatism ("My answer is right, and all others are wrong"), scepticism ("I don't know what is true, and I even doubt my own opinion"), and eclecticism ("Each meaning gives a partial view, so the more meanings the better") are inappropriate philosophic stances for managing a political term that has more than one meaning (see Walter Bryce Gallie).

Establishing what qualifies as a legitimate form of government continues to be a topic of great philosophical controversy. Forms of legitimate government are posited to include:
 Communism, where the legitimacy of a Communist state derives from having won a civil war, a revolution, or from having won an election such as the Presidency of Salvador Allende (1970–73) in Chile; thus, the actions of the Communist government are legitimate, authorised by the people. In the early 20th century, Communist parties based the arguments supporting the legitimacy of their rule and government upon the scientific nature of Marxism (see dialectical materialism).
 Constitutionalism. where the modern political concept of constitutionalism establishes the law as supreme over the private will, by integrating nationalism, democracy, and limited government. The political legitimacy of constitutionalism derives from popular belief and acceptance that the actions of the government are legitimate because they abide by the law codified in the political constitution. The political scientist Carl Joachim Friedrich (1901–1984) said that, in dividing political power among the organs of government, constitutional law effectively restrains the actions of the government (see checks and balances).
 Democracy, where government legitimacy derives from the popular perception that the elected government abides by democratic principles in governing, and thus is legally accountable to its people.
 Fascism, where in the 1920s and the 1930s it based its political legitimacy upon the arguments of traditional authority; respectively, the German National Socialists and the Italian Fascists claimed that the political legitimacy of their right to rule derived from philosophically denying the (popular) political legitimacy of elected liberal democratic governments. During the Weimar Republic (1918–1933), the political philosopher Carl Schmitt (1888–1985)—whose legal work as the "Crown Jurist of the Third Reich" promoted fascism and deconstructed liberal democracy—addressed the matter in Legalität und Legitimität (Legality and Legitimacy, 1932), an anti-democratic polemic treatise that asked: "How can parliamentary government make for law and legality, when a 49 per cent minority accepts as politically legitimate the political will of a 51 per cent majority?"
 Monarchy, where the divine right of kings establishes the political legitimacy of the rule of the monarch (king or queen); legitimacy also derives from the popular perception (tradition and custom) and acceptance of the monarch as the rightful ruler of nation and country. Contemporarily, such divine-right legitimacy is manifest in the absolute monarchy of the House of Saud (est. 1744), a royal family who have ruled and governed Saudi Arabia since the 18th century. Moreover, constitutional monarchy is a variant form of monarchic political legitimacy which combines traditional authority and legal–rational authority, by which means the monarch maintains nationalist unity (one people) and democratic administration (a political constitution).

See also

Further reading 

 Schoon, Eric W. (2022). "Operationalizing Legitimacy." American Sociological Review.
 Weigand, Florian (2022). Waiting for Dignity: Legitimacy and Authority in Afghanistan. Columbia University Press. ISBN 978-0-231-55364-3.

References 

Authority
Political concepts
Political culture
Social concepts
Sovereignty